This is a list of articles that are lists of plant diseases.

A

 List of foliage plant diseases (Acanthaceae)
 List of African daisy diseases
 List of African violet diseases
 List of foliage plant diseases (Agavaceae)
 List of alfalfa diseases
 List of almond diseases
 List of anemone diseases
 List of apple diseases
 List of apricot diseases
 List of foliage plant diseases (Araceae)
 List of foliage plant diseases (Arecaceae)
 List of foliage plant diseases (Araliaceae)
 List of foliage plant diseases (Araucariaceae)
 List of foliage plant diseases (Asclepiadaceae)
 List of asparagus diseases
 List of avocado diseases
 List of azalea diseases

Back to top

B

 List of banana and plantain diseases
 List of barley diseases
 List of beet diseases
 List of bellflower diseases
 List of foliage plant diseases (Bignoniaceae)
 List of black walnut diseases
 List of bleeding heart diseases
 List of foliage plant diseases (Bromeliaceae)
 List of butterfly flower diseases

Back to top

C

 List of cacao diseases
 List of foliage plant diseases (Cactaceae)
 List of caneberries diseases
 List of canola diseases
 List of carnation diseases
 List of carrot diseases
 List of cassava diseases
 List of cattleya diseases
 List of chickpea diseases
 List of cineraria diseases
 List of citrus diseases
 List of coconut palm diseases
 List of coffee diseases
 List of foliage plant diseases (Commelinaceae)
 List of common bean diseases
 List of cotton diseases
 List of crucifer diseases
 List of cucurbit diseases
 List of cyclamen diseases

Back to top

D

 List of Dahlia diseases
 List of date palm diseases
 List of Douglas-fir diseases
 List of durian diseases and pests

Back to top

E

 List of elm diseases
 List of English walnut diseases
 List of foliage plant diseases (Euphobiaceae)

Back to top

F

 List of flax diseases
 List of fuchsia diseases

Back to top

G

 List of foliage plant diseases (Gentianaceae)
 List of geranium diseases
 List of foliage plant diseases (Gesneriaceae)
 List of grape diseases

Back to top

H

 List of hazelnut diseases
 List of hemp diseases
 List of holiday cacti diseases
 List of hop diseases
 List of hydrangea diseases

Back to top

I

 List of impatiens diseases

Back to top

J

 List of Jerusalem cherry diseases

Back to top

K

 List of kalanchoe diseases

Back to top

L

 List of lentil diseases
 List of lettuce diseases
 List of lisianthus diseases

Back to top

M

 List of maize diseases
 List of mango diseases
 List of foliage plant diseases (Maranthaceae)
 List of mimulus, monkey-flower diseases
 List of mint diseases
 List of foliage plant diseases (Moraceae)
 List of mustard diseases

Back to top

N

Back to top

O

 List of oats diseases

Back to top

P

 List of papaya diseases
 List of pea diseases
 List of peach and nectarine diseases
 List of peanut diseases
 List of pear diseases
 List of pearl millet diseases
 List of pecan diseases
 List of pepper diseases
 List of Persian violet diseases
 List of pigeonpea diseases
 List of pineapple diseases
 List of foliage plant diseases (Piperaceae)
 List of pistachio diseases
 List of pocketbook plant diseases
 List of poinsettia diseases
 List of foliage plant diseases (Polypodiaceae)
 List of potato diseases
 List of primula diseases

Back to top

Q

Back to top

R

 List of red clover diseases
 List of rhododendron diseases
 List of rice diseases
 List of rose diseases
 List of rye diseases

Back to top

S

 List of safflower diseases
 List of sapphire flower diseases
 List of sorghum diseases
 List of soybean diseases
 List of spinach diseases
 List of strawberry diseases
 List of sugarcane diseases
 List of sunflower diseases
 List of sweetgum diseases
 List of sweetpotato diseases
 List of sycamore diseases

Back to top

T

 List of tea diseases
 List of tobacco diseases
 List of tomato diseases

Back to top

U

 List of foliage plant diseases (Urticaceae)

Back to top

V

 List of verbena disease
 List of foliage plant diseases (Vitaceae)

Back to top

W

 List of wheat diseases
 List of wild rice diseases

Back to top

X

Back to top

Y

Back to top

Z

Back to top

See also 
Lists of animal diseases

References 

 Common Names of Diseases, The American Phytopathological Society